Agnieta Cornelia Gijswijt (1873-1962) was a Dutch painter.

Biography
Gijswijt was born on 19 December 1873 in Gorinchem. She studied at the Rijksakademie van beeldende kunsten (State Academy of Fine Arts). From 1904 through 1924 she taught at the Dagtekenschool voor meisjes (Amsterdam) (Day drawing school for girls). Her students included  and Catharina Elisabeth Wassink.

Her work was included in the 1939 exhibition and sale Onze Kunst van Heden'' (Our Art of Today) at the Rijksmuseum in Amsterdam.

Giesberts died on 8 February 1962 in Amsterdam.

References

External links
images of Gijswijt's art on Invaluable

1873 births
1962 deaths
People from Gorinchem
Dutch women artists